Legislative elections were held in Mexico on 7 June 2015, alongside municipal elections.

Background
Traditionally elections had taken place on the first Sunday of July, but in 2015 were set to the first Sunday of June.

Electoral system
The 500 members of the  Chamber of Deputies were elected by two methods; 300 were elected in single-member constituencies,  and 200 by proportional representation in a single nationwide constituency. Constitutional reforms in 2014 led to the creation of the National Electoral Institute, replacing the Federal Electoral Institute.

Opinion polls

Results

References

External links
National Electoral Institute 

Mexico
Legislative
Legislative elections in Mexico
June 2015 events in Mexico